Robert "Bob" Kuban (born August 19, 1940) is an American musician and bandleader.

Career
Kuban was born in St. Louis, Missouri, United States, and was graduated from the St. Louis Institute of Music. In 1964, he formed the group Bob Kuban and The In-Men. Kuban was both its drummer and the bandleader. The group was an eight-piece band with horns, somewhat of a throwback for the time, considering that the British Invasion, mounted primarily by guitar-based bands that had initially formed in the UK, was taking place during that period.

Kuban was heavily influenced by Ike & Tina Turner, whom he would watch perform at Club Imperial in St. Louis before his band became regulars. He said, "I just loved the band so much... I mimicked a lot of the stuff that they did. We had the horn section in my band. When Ike and Tina Turner left, we were able to play there. We were there on Tuesday nights."

He is best known for his 1966 No. 12 pop hit, "The Cheater". For this hit single Kuban is honored in the Rock and Roll Hall of Fame's permanent exhibit on one-hit wonders.

After "The Cheater," Kuban never again scored high on the pop charts, although he did have two other top 100 hits: "The Teaser" peaked at No. 70; and a remake of the Lennon–McCartney song "Drive My Car" went to No. 93. Kuban continues to be a fixture on the St. Louis music scene, and still tours and performs at private parties. Bob Kuban and The In-Men performed for the opening ceremonies of Busch Memorial Stadium in St. Louis on May 10, 1966; and The Bob Kuban Brass performed before the last regular-season baseball game there on October 2, 2005.

In the 1960s, a spin-off of the group was a band called The Guise, led by In-Men organist and songwriter Greg Hoeltzel. The Guise performed in the 1969 St. Louis premiere of a composition by classical composer Arthur Custer and jazz composer Julius Hemphill titled "Songs of Freedom, Love, and War."

Death of Walter Scott

In a tragic coincidence, Walter Scott, who was the front man for The In-Men and the lead singer of "The Cheater", a song whose lyrics speak of infidelity, was murdered in 1983 by his wife's lover in a case that did not come to light until 1987. Scott's wife eventually admitted to helping conceal Scott's death.

Charted singles 

 "The Cheater" - 1965 (US #12)
 "The Teaser" - 1966 (US #70)
 "Drive My Car" - 1966 (US #93)

References

Living people
American drummers
American bandleaders
Music of St. Louis
Musicians from St. Louis
1940 births